Dawsonicyon ("Dawson's dog") is an extinct genus of placental mammals from clade Carnivoraformes, that lived in North America from early to middle Eocene. Fossils of type species Dawsonicyon isami are known from the ‘Bridger B’, site of Black’s Fork member of the Bridger Formation in Wyoming, and includes an almost complete skeleton (holotype DMNH 19585).

Phylogeny
The phylogenetic relationships of genus Dawsonicyon are shown in the following cladogram:
{{clade |style=font-size:85%;line-height:100%;
|grouplabel1={{clade labels
             |label1=†Gracilocyon/Oodectes clade |top1=17%
             |label2=†Vulpavus'' clade                 |top2=58%
             }}
|label1= Carnivoramorpha  |sublabel1=  
|1={{clade
   |thickness2=2 |thickness3=2 |thickness4=2 |label1= †Viverravidae  |sublabel1= sensu lato 
   |1=
   |label2= ?  |state2=dotted
   |2=†Carnivoramorpha sp. (UALVP 31176)
   |label3= ?  |state3=dotted
   |3=†Carnivoramorpha sp. (USNM 538395)
   |label4= ?  |state4=dotted
   |4=†"Sinopa" insectivorus''
   |label5= Carnivoraformes 
   |5=

See also
 Mammal classification
 Carnivoraformes

References

†
Eocene mammals
Prehistoric placental genera
Fossil taxa described in 2010
Extinct mammals of North America